Agnia may refer to:
Agnia (beetle), a genus of beetles
Agnia, Ivory Coast, a village in Lacs District, Ivory Coast
847 Agnia, a minor planet orbiting the sun
Agnia, a given name:
Agnia Ditkovskyte
Agnia Losina-Losinskaja